Shahjahan Mahmood is a Bangladeshi technocrat and chairman of Bangladesh Communication Satellite Company Limited. He is the former Chairman of Bangladesh Telecommunication Regulatory Commission.

Early life 
Mahmood completed his undergrad in engineering from Bangladesh University of Engineering and Technology. He completed his master's degree in operation research and PhD in systems engineering from the Massachusetts Institute of Technology.

Career 
Mahmood was a systems engineer at Marine Corps Base Quantico and later at Indian Head Naval Surface Warfare Center from 2004 to 2012.

On 24 September 2015, Mahmood was appointed Chairman of Bangladesh Telecommunication Regulatory Commission replacing Sunil Kanti Bose. initially Iqbal Mahmood was appointed Chairman of Bangladesh Telecommunication Regulatory Commission but that decision was cancelled within a week and was replaced by Shahjahan Mahmood. He briefly blocked Facebook, Viber, and WhatsApp in Bangladesh. In March 2017, Mahmood announced he was ready to shut down Facebook in Bangladesh if instructed by the government. He recommended that the government terminate Golam Razzaque, director of Bangabandhu-1 satellite, which the government did. He left Bangladesh Telecommunication Regulatory Commission in 2018 and was replaced by Md Jahirul Haque.

As chairman of Bangladesh Communication Satellite Company Limited, Mahmood oversaw the launch of Bangabandhu-1, the first satellite of Bangladesh.

References 

Living people
Bangladeshi civil servants
Bangladesh University of Engineering and Technology alumni
Massachusetts Institute of Technology alumni
Year of birth missing (living people)